Nitya Gopal Kundu (3 December 1935 – 15 September 2006) was a Bangladeshi artist, sculptor and entrepreneur. Kundu played an important role during the liberation war of Bangladesh in 1971. He founded the furniture company Otobi.

Early life
Kundu was born in Dinajpur district to his Kayastha parents Gnanendranath Kundu and Binapani Kundu. He was the fourth among seven siblings. Kundu was married to Phalguni Kundu and had a daughter Amity and a son Animesh.

Education and early career
Kundu graduated from Dhaka Art College (now the Institute of Fine Arts) in 1959. In the years leading up to 1971, he worked at the United States Information Service (USIS) in Dhaka designing exhibits and graphics.

Liberation War
During the Bangladesh Liberation War, Kundu worked with the artist Quamrul Hassan at the public relations department of the Bangladesh Government-in-Exile at Mujibnagar. In collaboration with Hassan and a group of notable artists namely Debdas Chakraborty, Nasir Biswas, Pranesh Mandal and Biren Shome; Kundu worked on numerous posters and works of art aimed at arousing the newly formed Mukti Bahini liberation army and also raising awareness of the genocide being unleashed by the Pakistan Army on the people of Bangladesh.

It was during this period he designed two posters which became among the most recognized
works of art produced during the war. They were titled Sada Jagrata Banglar Mukti Bahini and Banglar Hindu, Banglar Bouddha, Banglar Christian, Banglar Musalman; Amra Sabai Bangali.

The Liberation War was the inspiration for Kundu's most famous work, the sculpture Shabash Bangladesh, a tribute to the fallen freedom fighters of the Mukti Bahini. This is situated on the campus of Rajshahi University.

Entrepreneur
In the 1975, following a brief stint at Bitopi advertising agency, Kundu established his own company, a furniture store featuring his own designs, Otobi. Within a relatively short period, Otobi became the most prominent Bangladeshi furniture brand. He started the company with an initial investment of 5000 taka.

Works

Kundu crafted several national trophies including National Film Award, President Gold Cup, Notun Kuri Award, Asia Cricket Cup, and the Ekushey Padak.

His some notables works are the following:
 Sada Jagrata Banglar Muktibahini (poster)
 Amra Sabai Bangali (poster)
 Banglar Bir Muktijoddha (poster)
Shabash Bangladesh (sculpture at University of Rajshahi)
 SAARC Fountain at Karwan Bazar, Dhaka
 Fountain, Dhaka High Court, Dhaka
 Sampan, Shah Amanat International Airport, Chittagong
 Kadam Fountain, National Press Club, Dhaka

Death 
Kundu died of old age complications at Ibrahim Memorial Cardiac Centre in Dhaka Friday morning.

Awards and honors
 Ekushey Padak (1997)
 Daily Star-DHL Best Entrepreneur Award
 National Film Award
 President Gold Cup
 Notun Kuri Award (Bangladesh Television)

References

1935 births
2006 deaths
Bengali Hindus
Bangladeshi Hindus
Bangladeshi sculptors
Recipients of the Ekushey Padak
20th-century Bangladeshi businesspeople
20th-century sculptors
20th-century Bangladeshi painters
20th-century male artists